Charles Harold Hayes (September 18, 1906 – April 3, 1995) was the 8th Assistant Commandant of the Marine Corps.

Biography
McDougal was born September 18, 1906, in San Marcial, New Mexico. After joining the Marine Corps, he participated in World War II. By the time he retired, he had achieved the rank of lieutenant general.

He died April 3, 1995, and was buried at Arlington National Cemetery.

Awards and decorations

See also

 List of 1st Marine Aircraft Wing commanders

References

1906 births
1995 deaths
United States Marine Corps generals
Recipients of the Legion of Merit
United States Marine Corps personnel of World War II
United States Marine Corps personnel of the Korean War
People from Socorro County, New Mexico
United States Naval Academy alumni
Burials at Arlington National Cemetery
Recipients of the Navy Distinguished Service Medal
Assistant Commandants of the United States Marine Corps